The 1889–90 Scottish Districts season is a record of all the  rugby union matches for Scotland's district teams.

History

The Midlands District was founded in this year.

Glasgow District and North of Scotland District were due to play at Forfar on 14 December 1889. Edinburgh District and South of Scotland District were due to play at Galashiels on 14 December 1889. Both matches were called off due to the weather despite the teams all showing up for play. The South team was selected.

The Fettesian side called off the match against North of Scotland District due to the hardness of the ground. The North side were ready to play and The Scotsman noted that much disappointment was caused by the decision of the Fettesian captain Wauchope.

Results

Inter-City

Glasgow District: A. Lede (Glasgow University), W. J. Reid (West of Scotland), C. F. P. Fraser (Glasgow University), J. J. Mitchell (Glasgow Academicals), C. E. Orr (West of Scotland), C. E. McEwan (West of Scotland), W. A. Macdonald [captain], E. M. Donaldson (Glasgow University), K. M. Bishop (Glasgow Academicals), J. D. Boswell (West of Scotland), J. E. Orr (West of Scotland), W. Auld (West of Scotland), H. F. Menzies (West of Scotland), E. H. Wynne (West of Scotland), R. O. Caw (Kelvinside Academicals),  

Edinburgh District: A. W. Cameron (Watsonians), W. C. Smith (Edinburgh University), H. J. Stevenson (Edinburgh Academicals), J. Duncan (Edinburgh Academicals), F. B. Majoribanks (Edinburgh Academicals), G. R. Aitchison (Edinburgh Wanderers), A. M. Gordon(Edinburgh Academicals) [captain], W. R. Ferguson (Edinburgh Academicals), (Edinburgh Academicals) A. A. Scot-Skirving (Edinburgh Academicals), A. Duke (Royal HSFP), R. J. Davidson (Royal HSFP), P. H. Blyth (Watsonians), R.M. M. Roddich (Watsonians), A. T. Aitken (Edinburgh Institution)

Other Scottish matches

North of Scotland District:   

Fettesian-Lorettonians:

Midlands District:   

Fettesian-Lorettonians:

English matches

No other District matches played.

International matches

No touring matches this season.

References

1889–90 in Scottish rugby union
Scottish Districts seasons